Dalcerides sofia is a moth in the family Dalceridae. It was described by Harrison Gray Dyar Jr. in 1910. It is found in southern Mexico, Guatemala, El Salvador, Nicaragua and Costa Rica. The habitat consists of tropical moist, tropical dry, tropical premontane wet, subtropical moist, subtropical dry and warm temperate wet forests.

The length of the forewings is 6–9 mm for males and 9–11 mm for females. The forewings are cream colored with light brown suffusion, especially in the posterior half of the wing, as well as postmedially and subterminally. There is a large medium brown spot distal to upper half of the discal cell and a tuft of white scales distal to the lower half of the discal cell. The hindwings are white. Adults are on wing year round.

The larvae have been recorded feeding on an unidentified orchid species.

References

Moths described in 1910
Dalceridae